Cubist Pharmaceuticals was an American biopharmaceutical company that targeted pathogens like MRSA.

.  The company employed 638 people, mostly in Lexington, MA. On 8 December 2014, Merck & Co. acquired Cubist for $102 per share in cash ($8.4 billion).

History
Cubist was founded in May 1992 by John K. Clarke, Paul R. Schimmel, Ph.D. and Barry M. Bloom, Ph.D, all of whom were also directors.
Cubist appeared on Fortune 2010’s List of fastest growing companies, and was named to the 2010 Deloitte Technology Fast 500.

In 2011, the company acquired Adolor, maker of a drug for treatment of constipation.

The  company expected sales of its drug Cubicin to grow to more than 1 billion dollars per year.

In July 2013, Cubist Pharmaceuticals agreed to purchase Trius Therapeutics and Optimer Pharmaceuticals for around $1.6 billion.

In 2014, succeeding Michael Bonney as President, Robert J. Perez, was announced to take leadership on January 1, 2015.

In January 2015 Cubist Pharmaceuticals became a wholly owned subsidiary of Merck & Co.

Products
The company developed Cubicin (daptomycin) for injection, the first antibiotic in a class of anti-infectives called lipopeptides.  In 2011, Cubist settled a patent litigation with Teva Pharmaceutical Industries regarding Cubicin.
In April 2011 it reached a deal with Optimer Pharmaceuticals in which its class of bacterium fighting drugs will be co marketed with Optimer's Fidaxomicin/Dificid (for $15 million per year).

In 2011, its product pipeline focused on gram-negative bacterial infections, Clostridium difficile-associated diarrhea, and respiratory syncytial virus.

Tedizolid was approved by the US Food and Drug Administration on June 20, 2014.

References

Companies formerly listed on the Nasdaq
Biopharmaceutical companies
Biotechnology companies of the United States
American companies established in 1992
Pharmaceutical companies established in 1992
Life sciences industry
Biotechnology companies established in 1992
Biotechnology companies disestablished in 2015
Pharmaceutical companies disestablished in 2015
1992 establishments in Massachusetts
2015 disestablishments in Massachusetts
Defunct pharmaceutical companies of the United States
Defunct companies based in Massachusetts
Health care companies based in Massachusetts
Companies based in Lexington, Massachusetts
2015 mergers and acquisitions
Merck & Co.